The 1959–60 Czechoslovak Extraliga season was the 17th season of the Czechoslovak Extraliga, the top level of ice hockey in Czechoslovakia. 12 teams participated in the league, and Ruda Hvezda Brno won the championship.

Standings

External links
History of Czechoslovak ice hockey

Czech
Czechoslovak Extraliga seasons
1959 in Czechoslovak sport
1960 in Czechoslovak sport